Ficus septica (called Hauili in the Philippines, 稜果榕 in Taiwan) is a shrub or tree of the family Moraceae living at low altitudes from northeast India to north Australia (Queensland), and throughout Malesia.
It lives on the edge of the vegetation, often in degraded environments. The seeds of this species are dispersed by numerous species, including fruit bats (Megachiroptera) when present.

Taxonomy
Ficus septica was described first by the Dutch botanist Nicolaas Laurens Burman in 1768. Two centuries later, E. J. H. Corner listed three varieties for Ficus septica: F. septica var. septica distributed all over the range of the species; F. septica var. cauliflora limited to Queensland, Australia and the Solomon islands; and F. septica var. salicifolia endemic to the Philippines Islands. Then in the latest Flora Malesiana edition, Cornelis Christiaan Berg put all these varieties in synonymy together under the name Ficus septica.
Within the genus, Ficus septica belongs to the subgenus Sycomorus section Sycocarpus subsection Sycocarpus.

Description
Tree or shrub up to 25 meters. The latex of F. septica is characteristically yellow. Leaves and petioles are both glabrous. Leaves are symmetric, elliptic to oblong.  Figs grow often in pairs but can be solitary or in groups of up to four. Figs are depressed-globose to ellipsoid, the apex is flat or concave. Seven to twelve ribs towards to ostiole. At maturity, whitish to yellowish dots appear on the fig. The individuals from Philippines have their stems covered by short hairs while those found in Taiwan are glabrous.

Habitat
Ficus septica trees live up to 1800m in montane forests or secondary growth environments. It can be seen often along rivers. In Taiwan, at the northern limit of its distribution, F. septica lives up to 500m in secondary growths and along roads and coastlines.

Ecology
Ficus septica is pollinated by fig wasps from the genus Ceratosolen. Usually members of the genus Ficus are pollinated by a single species of pollinating fig wasps specific to each fig species, but recent observations of Ficus septica have shown there to be three pollinating species in the South of Taiwan and two in the Philippines.

The figs of Ficus septica have been reported to be eaten by 22 animal species and among them 14 are bats:

 Double-eyed fig parrot
 Unspecified fruit dove
 Black-naped oriole
 Northern common cuscus
 Stein's cuscus
 Common spotted cuscus
 Mantled guereza
 Black rat
 Lesser short-nosed fruit bat
 Horsfield's fruit bat
 Greater short-nosed fruit bat
 Indonesian short-nosed fruit bat
 Bare-backed fruit bat
 Lesser naked-backed fruit bat
 Long-tongued nectar bat
 Long-tongued fruit bat
 Broad-striped tube-nosed fruit bat
 Common tube-nosed fruit bat
 Greater musky fruit bat
 Geoffroy's rousette
 Common blossom bat

References

septica
Flora of Australia
Flora of Malesia
Flora of Taiwan
Dioecious plants
Taxa named by Nicolaas Laurens Burman